The Melon Music Award for Song of the Year is one of the awards from the annual Melon Music Awards, an event that uses data from Melon's streaming service to celebrate artists who have had exceptional performance during the year.

From 2005 to 2008, awards for best song of the year were based entirely on online voting and were announced on Melon's website. Live ceremonies began in Seoul starting in 2009, with Song of the Year becoming one of the ceremonies' daesang (grand prize) awards.  The award is given based on several criteria; as of 2021, 60% of the evaluation is based on figures for digital downloads and streaming, 20% from the evaluation of a panel of judges, and 20% from online voting. 

The artist with the most Song of the Year awards is BTS, having won four times in 2017, 2019, 2020 and 2021 with "Spring Day", "Boy with Luv", "Dynamite" and "Butter", respectively. Wonder Girls received the prize twice during its online period in 2007 and 2008, winning for "Tell Me" and "So Hot". With seven total nominations, IU is the most nominated artist in the category, while BTS and 2NE1 have the second most nominations with five each. IU was awarded Song of the Year once with "Good Day" in 2011. A total of 13 artists have been awarded in the category since 2005, including six male groups and three female groups. Baek Ji-young, IU, Psy and Taeyang are the only soloists who have won.

Winners and nominees

Artists with multiple wins
4 wins
 BTS 
2 wins
 Wonder Girls

Artists with multiple nominations

7 nominations
 IU

5 nominations
 2NE1
 BTS

3 nominations
 Big Bang
 Exo
 G-Dragon
 Girls' Generation

2 nominations
 Baek Ji-young
 Beast
 Blackpink
 Busker Busker
 Davichi
 Psy
 Sistar
 T-ara
 Twice
 Zico

See also
 Mnet Asian Music Award for Song of the Year
 Melon Music Award for Album of the Year

Notes

References

External links
 Melon Music Awards official site

Melon Music Awards
Song awards